The 2021–22 NIFL Premier Intermediate League (known as the Lough 41 Premier Intermediate League for sponsorship reasons) was the fifth season of the NIFL Premier Intermediate League, the third tier of the Northern Ireland Football League - the national football league in Northern Ireland. The season began on 17 August 2021 and concluded on 7 May 2022.

The Premier Intermediate League returned after a one-year hiatus, following the cancellation of the 2020–21 season due to the COVID-19 pandemic in Northern Ireland. Annagh United were the reigning champions from the 2020–21 season, and were promoted to the NIFL Championship.

Teams

League table

Results

Matches 1–20
During matches 1–20 each team played every other team twice (home and away).

References

External links

Northern Ireland
2021–22 in Northern Ireland association football